Events from the year 1770 in Ireland.

Incumbent
Monarch: George III

Events
21 March – the College Historical Society, a debating society at Trinity College Dublin, founded by Edmund Burke, holds its first meeting when Burke's Club (founded 1747) merges with the Historical Club (1753).
Lough Ree Yacht Club is founded as Athlone Yacht Club.

Arts and literature
 John O'Keeffe's play The Giant's Causeway.

Births
30 November – Andrew Blayney, 11th Baron Blayney, soldier, politician and peer (died 1832).
Full date unknown
 William Reid Clanny, physician and inventor of the Clanny safety lamp for miners (died 1850).
 James Orr, rhyming weaver poet (died 1816).

Deaths
 12 January – James Stopford, 1st Earl of Courtown, politician (born 1700).
 12 September – William Annesley, 1st Viscount Glerawly, politician (born 1710).
Full date unknown
 Francis Lucas, naval officer and merchant trader (b. c1741).

References

 
Years of the 18th century in Ireland
Ireland
1770s in Ireland